Ad Plumbaria was a civitas (town) of the Roman North Africa The town flourished from AD 300-AD 640.

The town is shown on the Tabula Peutingeriana, as being on the road to Hippo Regius.

The presumed ruins of the town were discovered in the mid-1800s in the middle of the Lake of Fetzara.

References

4th-century establishments in the Roman Empire
640s disestablishments in the Byzantine Empire
Populated places established in the 4th century
Populated places disestablished in the 7th century
Former populated places in Algeria
Roman towns and cities in Africa (Roman province)
Roman sites in Algeria